Chippewa Secondary School is located along Chippewa Creek in North Bay, Ontario and is part of the Near North District School Board. A Grade 7-12 school, Chippewa offers English and Immersion French programming for Grades 7 through 12. In addition, students can enroll in Specialist High Skills Majors in Business, Sports or Health and Wellness.  Chippewa Secondary School is an accredited school for the International Baccalaureate Diploma Program since 2015.

Chippewa's motto is "Carpe Diem" which is Latin for "Seize The Day". Athletes and students at Chippewa are known as the Chippewa Raiders, and the school colours are scarlet and gold.

The school was founded in 1958 and was named after the First Nation Chippewas.

Robotics 
Chippewa Intermediate and Secondary School is the birthplace of  FIRST Robotics Competition Team 1305, nicknamed Ice Cubed.

Academics 
Chippewa is the first public school in North Bay to offer the IB Diploma Program.

Arts 
Chippewa Secondary school has several art programs including Dance, Music, Visual Arts, Film and Video, Vocal Music, and Drama. Chippewa offers a Dance team "Raider Dance" and three separate bands, including Senior Band, Junior Band, and Jazz Band.

See also
List of high schools in Ontario
International Baccalaureate Diploma Program

External links
 
  FRC Team 1305 Near North Student Robotics Initiative

Educational institutions established in 1958
High schools in North Bay, Ontario
1958 establishments in Ontario